Islām Qala (Persian/Pashto: اسلام قلعه, also Eslām Qalʿeh), known historically as Kafir Qala, is a border town in the western Herat province of Afghanistan, near the Afghanistan–Iran border. It is the official port of entry by land from neighboring Taybad in Iran.

Islam Qala is administered as part of Islam Qala District in Herat Province and is linked to the city of Herat via the Islam Qala-Herat Highway. The town plays an important role when it comes to the economy of Afghanistan because a substantial volume of national trade passes through it.

Islam Qala is believed to have a population of about 16,408 residents. It has gradually expanded in the last two decades due to the establishment of various facilities. Among them is a refugees repatriation center in which large number of returnees are processed everyday by the Ministry of Refugees and the International Organization for Migration (IOM). The town has Afghan Border Police and other national security forces.

History 

Islam Qala became a border town during the Durrani Empire in the 19th century, after Afghanistan became a sovereign state. Many armies, traders and travelers have passed through the town throughout history. The Asian Highway 1 (AH1), which is part of the Asian Highway Network from Tokyo in Japan to west of Istanbul in Turkey, where it connects to the European route E80 (E80) that reaches to Lisbon, passes in Islam Qala.

On February 13, 2021, due to corruption and negligence, large number of trucks were burnt by a fire incident at a parking area in Islam Qala. On July 9, 2021, the entire town fell to the Taliban forces without incident. Since then the corruption in the town has been eliminated and government revenue increased to over 8 billion afghanis in less than a year.

Climate
With an influence from the local steppe climate, Islam Qala features a cold semi-arid climate (BSk) under the Köppen climate classification. The average temperature in Islam Qala is 17.3 °C, while the annual precipitation averages 225 mm.

July is the hottest month of the year with an average temperature of 29.5 °C. The coldest month January has an average temperature of 5.5 °C.

See also
Demogan
Ghulam Khan
Hairatan
Herat Province
Sher Khan Bandar
Spin Boldak
Torghundi
Torkham
Zaranj

References

Additional images relating to Islam Qala

External links 

  (Ariana News, Apr. 24, 2022).
  (Al Jazeera English, Dec. 1, 2021).

Populated places in Herat Province
Afghanistan–Iran border crossings